The 1895–96 Welsh Amateur Cup was the sixth season of the Welsh Amateur Cup. The cup was won by Queensferry Ironopolis who defeated Shrewsbury Athletic 3-0 in the final, at The Racecourse, Wrexham.

First round

Second round

Third round

Fourth round

Semi-final

Final

References

1895-96
Welsh Cup
1895–96 domestic association football cups